Serinsu can refer to:

 Serinsu, Narman
 Serinsu, Yusufeli